Novoandreyevka is a rural locality (a selo) and the administrative center of Novoandreyevsky Selsoviet of Burlinsky District, Altai Krai, Russia. The population was 281 as of 2016. It was founded in 1905. There are 3 streets.

Geography 
Novoandreyevka is located 47 km south of Burla (the district's administrative centre) by road. Pokrovka is the nearest rural locality.

Ethnicity 
The village is inhabited by Ukrainians and others.

References 

Rural localities in Burlinsky District